George Thomas Baird (November 3, 1847 – April 21, 1917) was a Canadian politician.

Born in Andover, New Brunswick, the eldest son of George Baird of Scottish descent, he was educated at Carleton County Grammar School. He was married November 12, 1879 to Ida T. Sadler, of St. John, N.B. He held a first class certificate from the Normal School of New Brunswick, and for six years he taught a Superior School and was also Postmaster from 1878 until 1882. He became a lumber merchant and general dealer in Perth Centre, New Brunswick starting in 1874.

He was first elected to the Legislative Assembly of New Brunswick in 1884. He was appointed to the Legislative Council of New Brunswick in April 1891 and served until its abolition in 1892. At the general election held in 1892 he was again elected to the Legislative Assembly, where he sat until June 19, 1895 when he was called to the Senate on the advice of Mackenzie Bowell. A Conservative, he represented the senatorial division of Victoria, New Brunswick and served for almost 22 years until his death in 1917.

References

External links
 

1847 births
1917 deaths
Canadian senators from New Brunswick
Conservative Party of Canada (1867–1942) senators
Progressive Conservative Party of New Brunswick MLAs
People from Perth-Andover
Conservative Party of New Brunswick MLCs